The Pusat Tenaga Rakyat (PUTERA) was a major political party in Malaysia opposed to the United Malays National Organisation (UMNO) and the Malay-supremacist ideology of Ketuanan Melayu. It formed an opposition coalition with the All-Malaya Council of Joint Action. "Raayat" is the archaic spelling for the Malay word rakyat which means "citizens".

Defunct political parties in Malaysia
Year of establishment missing